Dry Wood is an unincorporated community in Crawford County, Kansas, United States.

History
A post office was opened in Dry Wood (also spelled Drywood) in 1894, and remained in operation until it was discontinued in 1915.

References

Further reading

External links
 Crawford County maps: Current, Historic, KDOT

Unincorporated communities in Crawford County, Kansas
Unincorporated communities in Kansas